This is a list of members of the South Australian Legislative Council from 1912 to 1915

It was the fourth Legislative Council to be fully determined by provisions of the (State) Constitution Act 779 of 1901, which provided for, inter alia, a reduction in the number of seats from 24 to 18, realignment of District borders to encompass Assembly electorates, six-year terms (one half of the Council retiring every three years), and elections held jointly with the House of Assembly.

The North-Eastern district was renamed "Midland" from 1912

 Liberal MLC John Duncan died on 8 October 1913. Liberal candidate David Gordon won the resulting by-election on 15 November.

References
Parliament of South Australia — Statistical Record of the Legislature

Members of South Australian parliaments by term
20th-century Australian politicians